CUB domain-containing protein 1 (CDCP1) is a protein that in humans is encoded by the CDCP1 gene. CDCP1 has also been designated as CD318 (cluster of differentiation 318) and Trask (Transmembrane and associated with src kinases). Alternatively spliced transcript variants encoding distinct isoforms have been reported.

Function 

CDCP1/Trask  is not important for the development of the mouse. Adult mice lacking CDCP1 do not exhibit gross morphologic, reproductive or behavioral abnormalities compared with wild-type mice, and histologic examination of multiple organ systems has shown no significant pathology and no observed histologic differences. CDCP1 is a ligand for CD6, a receptor molecule expressed on certain T-cells and may play a role in their migration and chemotaxis. As such CDCP1 may contribute to autoimmune diseases such as encephalomyelitis, multiple sclerosis and inflammatory arthritis.

CDCP1 is a 140 kD transmembrane glycoprotein with a large extracellular domain (ECD) containing two CUB domains, and a smaller intracellular domain (ICD). CDCP1 is cleaved by serine proteases at the extracellular domain next to Arg368 to generate a truncated molecule of 80 kDa size. Different cell lines express different amounts of p140 and p80, depending on the activity of endogenous serine proteases. In vivo, CDCP1 is not cleaved during normal physiological circumstances, but its cleavage can be induced during tumorigenesis or tissue injury.

The intracellular domain of CDCP1 contains five tyrosine residues - Y707, Y734, Y743, Y762 and Y806. Phosphorylation of CDCP1 is exclusively mediated by Src kinases and depends on the adherence state of the cells. The tyrosine phosphorylation of CDCP1 in cultured cells occurs when cells are induced to detach by trypsin or EDTA, or seen spontaneously during mitotic detachment. The loss of anchorage or cellular detachment is associated with the phosphorylation of CDCP1 as well as the concomitant dephosphorylation of focal adhesion proteins, consistent with the dismantling of focal adhesions. Contrary, during cellular attachment CDCP1 is dephosphorylated, allowing the phosphorylation of focal adhesion proteins. The anti-adhesion and anti-migratory functions of CDCP1 are mediated through negative regulation on integrin receptors.

Clinical significance 

The phosphorylation of CDCP1 is seen in many cancers, including some pre-invasive cancers as well as in invasive tumors and in tumor metastases.

References

Further reading

External links 
 
 

Clusters of differentiation